There are 251 firm orders by 14 customers for the passenger version of the Airbus A380-800, all of which have been delivered . There were originally also 27 orders for the freighter version, the A380F, but when this programme was frozen following production delays, 20 A380F orders were cancelled and the remaining seven were converted to A380-800s.

Orders by customers

Overview
The following orders have been placed and deliveries made, from Airbus Orders & Deliveries data, :

First deliveries to airlines

Orders and deliveries graph

Data through 31 December 2021.

Chronological orders

By year

Cumulative orders and deliveries

Data from Airbus as of December 2021.
 

<noinclude>

Details

Models

Variants

See also
List of Airbus A350 XWB orders and deliveries
List of Boeing 787 orders and deliveries

References

External links 
 Airbus Orders & Deliveries

Orders and deliveries
380